The Baton Rouge Louisiana Temple is the 94th operating temple of the Church of Jesus Christ of Latter-day Saints (LDS Church).

History
The first Mormon missionaries arrived in Louisiana in 1841. A few joined the church, but left Louisiana to be with the rest of the body of the church. New Orleans was the port of entry to the United States for most of the early British converts of the church. Between 1840 and 1855, around 18,500 members crossed the ocean to the U.S. and 17,600 of them first arrived in New Orleans. Because of this, most church members in New Orleans were either emigrants who could not yet afford to go further or church agents who helped the emigrants continue their journey. After 1855 when the last of the emigrants left New Orleans the church no longer had a presence in the Louisiana. In 1895 Mormon missionaries were sent again to the state and today there are more than 24,000 members in Louisiana.

The LDS Church First Presidency announced on October 14, 1998, that a temple would be built in Baton Rouge and a groundbreaking ceremony was held on May 8, 1999. The temple was open to the public for tours from July 1 to 8, 2000. LDS Church president Gordon B. Hinckley dedicated the temple on July 16, 2000. Four dedicatory services were held to accommodate the members who wanted to attend. Just before the first dedication service a cornerstone ceremony was held.

The Baton Rouge Louisiana Temple serves 24,000 LDS Church members in the New Orleans, Alexandria, Baton Rouge, Denham Springs, and Monroe Louisiana stakes, as well as members in Gulfport, Hattiesburg, and Jackson, Mississippi stakes.

The exterior is made from Imperial Danby White marble quarried in Vermont, and the grounds are beautifully landscaped.

On June 27, 2017, the LDS Church announced that beginning February 2018, the temple would close for renovations that are anticipated to be completed in 2019. On May 3, 2019, the church announced the public open house that was held from October 26 through November 2, 2019, excluding Sunday. The temple was rededicated by Quentin L. Cook on November 17, 2019.

In 2020, the Baton Rouge Louisiana Temple was closed in response to the coronavirus pandemic.

See also

 Comparison of temples of The Church of Jesus Christ of Latter-day Saints
 List of temples of The Church of Jesus Christ of Latter-day Saints
 List of temples of The Church of Jesus Christ of Latter-day Saints by geographic region
 Temple architecture (Latter-day Saints)
 The Church of Jesus Christ of Latter-day Saints in Louisiana
 The Church of Jesus Christ of Latter-day Saints in Mississippi

References

Additional reading

External links
 
 Official Baton Rouge Louisiana Temple page
 Baton Rouge Louisiana Temple at ChurchofJesusChristTemples.org

20th-century Latter Day Saint temples
Buildings and structures in Baton Rouge, Louisiana
Temples in Louisiana
Temples (LDS Church) completed in 2000
Temples (LDS Church) in the United States
2000 establishments in Louisiana